2 Timothy 4 is the fourth (and the last) chapter of the Second Epistle to Timothy in the New Testament of the Christian Bible.  The letter is traditionally attributed to Paul the Apostle, the last one written in Rome before his death (c. 64 or 67), addressed to Timothy. There are charges that it is the work of an anonymous follower, after Paul's death in the first century AD. This chapter contains intensely personal material, more than any other epistles, in relation to Paul's imminent death, ending with personal comments and salutations.

Text
The original text was written in Koine Greek. This chapter is divided into 22 verses.

Textual witnesses
Some early manuscripts containing the text of this chapter are:
Codex Sinaiticus (AD 330–360)
Codex Alexandrinus (400–440)
Codex Ephraemi Rescriptus (c. 450; complete)
Codex Freerianus (c. 450; extant verses 1, 8–10, 18–20)
Codex Claromontanus (c. 550)

Location

Places mentioned in this chapter (with the related persons) are:
Corinth (Erastus)
Dalmatia (Titus)
Ephesus (Tychicus & Timothy)
Galatia (Crescens)
Miletus (Trophimus)
Thessalonica (Demas)
Troas (Carpus)

The Final Charge to Timothy (4:1–8)
Paul charges Timothy to step into Paul's place in the worldwide mission.

Verse 1
In the presence of God and of Christ Jesus, who will judge the living and the dead, and in view of his appearing and his kingdom, I give you this charge:
In view of the imminent end of his life, Paul is expressing himself with the utmost solemnity three facts in his concluding charge: 'the reality of the judgment of Christ, the certainty of his return, and the establishment of his kingdom'.

Verse 2
Preach the word; be prepared in season and out of season; correct, rebuke and encourage—with great patience and careful instruction. 
Timothy's commission is outlined with five imperative verbs (preach, be prepared, correct, rebuke, encourage) which will be described further in the following verses.

Final Instructions and Personal Information (4:9–18)
Here Paul mentions many individuals, friends and companions, as well as some personal requests for Timothy to do.

Verse 10
for Demas has forsaken me, having loved this present world, and has departed for Thessalonica—Crescens for Galatia, Titus for Dalmatia.
"Crescens": only mentioned here.

Verse 11
Only Luke is with me. Get Mark and bring him with you, because he is helpful to me in my ministry.
 "Luke": The 'beloved physician' (Colossians 4:14) and the writer of the "Gospel of Luke" and "the Acts of the Apostles". He was Paul's faithful companion in his travels and sufferings.
 "Get Mark, and bring him with you": who at that time might be at Ephesus, or somewhere along Timothy's way to Rome. Presumably the same John Mark of Jerusalem, the son of Mary (Acts 12:12), Barnabas' sister, who was with Paul and Barnabas in their first journey (Acts 12:25), and departed from them at Pamphylia, causing a great quarrel between Paul and Barnabas leading to their separation in ministry, but now Paul had a better opinion of him, and was apparently reconciled to him, that he wants his assistance as later noted in Colossians 4:10; .
 "For he is helpful (NKJV; KJV: "profitable") to me for the ministry": to assist in preaching the Gospel.

Verse 12
And Tychicus I have sent to Ephesus.
"Tychicus": a friend of Paul, mentioned 5 times in the New Testament (Acts 20:4; ; ; ; 2 Timothy 4:12).

Verse 13
Bring the cloak that I left with Carpus at Troas when you come—and the books, especially the parchments.
"Cloak": see Phelonion
"Carpus": only mentioned here.
"Troas": ancient Troy, a point of departure from Asia to Europe.

Verse 14
Alexander the coppersmith did me much harm. May the Lord repay him according to his works.
"Alexander the coppersmith" or "the metalworker" could be identified with the person in Acts 19:33 or in 1 Timothy 1:20, who at this point gave a hard opposition to Paul's message.

The Final Greetings (4:19–22)

Verse 19
Greet Prisca and Aquila, and the household of Onesiphorus.
Catholics regard this verse as an implication that Onesiphorus was already dead, as it is implied previously in 2 Timothy 1:16–18, since Paul directly greets Aquila and Priscilla (here shortened as "Prisca") and seems to give greeting to "the house of Onesiphorus" to comfort his family.

Verse 20
Erastus stayed in Corinth, but Trophimus I have left in Miletus sick.
"Erastus": a city-treasurer of Corinth (Romans 16:23; cf. ).
"Trophimus": one of Paul's close friends during his missionary travels.

See also

 Related Bible parts: Matthew 24, Colossians 4, Titus 1

References

Citations

Sources

External links
 King James Bible - Wikisource
English Translation with Parallel Latin Vulgate
Online Bible at GospelHall.org (ESV, KJV, Darby, American Standard Version, Bible in Basic English)
Multiple bible versions at Bible Gateway (NKJV, NIV, NRSV etc.)

Timothy 2  4